Shenzhen Bus Group Co., Ltd (SBG) () is a Chinese state-owned company that offers bus passenger transportation services in Shenzhen. In 2017, it made international news as the world's first fully electric bus fleet.

History 
SBG was founded in 1975 and was wholly controlled by State-owned Assets Supervision and Administration Commission of Shenzhen.

In 2005, Kowloon Motor Bus invested around 390 million CNY (47 million USD) to subscribe a 35% stake of the company, which was then re-registered as Shenzhen Bus Group Co., Ltd.

Operation 
In 2017, SBG retired all of its diesel buses and started operating a fleet of 5698 pure electric buses on 352 routes in Shenzhen, making it the world's first fully electric bus fleet. It completed around 800 million passenger journeys among the total number of 1.6 billion in Shenzhen in 2018.

See also 
 Transport in Shenzhen
 List of bus routes in Shenzhen

References

External links 

 Official Website
Transport in Shenzhen
Bus operating companies of China
Transit authorities with electric buses
Chinese companies established in 1975
Transport companies established in 1975